Typhlomangelia vexilliformis is an extinct species of sea snail, a marine gastropod mollusk in the family Borsoniidae.

Description

Distribution
This extinct marine species is endemic to New Zealand.

References

 Maxwell, P.A. (2009). Cenozoic Mollusca. pp. 232–254 in Gordon, D.P. (ed.) New Zealand inventory of biodiversity. Volume one. Kingdom Animalia: Radiata, Lophotrochozoa, Deuterostomia. Canterbury University Press, Christchurch.

External links
  Bouchet P., Kantor Yu.I., Sysoev A. & Puillandre N. (2011) A new operational classification of the Conoidea. Journal of Molluscan Studies 77: 273-308

vexilliformis
Gastropods described in 1923
Gastropods of New Zealand